Chris  Holden (born July 19, 1960) is an American politician serving in the California State Assembly. He is a Democrat representing the 41st Assembly District, which encompasses the northern San Gabriel Valley, and is centered in Pasadena.

He is a member of the California Legislative Black Caucus. Prior to his election to the Assembly in 2012, Holden was a Mayor and City Councilmember in Pasadena. He is the son of longtime Los Angeles politician Nate Holden.  Holden currently serves as Chairman of the Appropriations Committee, the most powerful position after Speaker.

History
Prior to being elected to the Assembly, Holden was a member of the Pasadena City Council, and a former Mayor of the city, serving from 1997 to 1999. He is the second longest-serving city council member in the city's history, having served since 1989.

Holden is an alumnus of Pasadena High School and San Diego State University. He first ran for seat 3 of the Pasadena City Council in 1985, but lost narrowly to incumbent Loretta Thompson-Glickman. He was elected four years later, and was appointed Mayor in 1997. During his term, the City charter was revised to allow for open election of the mayor. However, in the first citywide mayoral election, Holden was defeated by former Councilmember and former Pasadena Mayor Bill Bogaard.

Holden previously served as the Assembly Majority Floor Leader.

Electoral history

2014 California State Assembly

In 2014, Holden was reelected to the Assembly with 59% of the vote. Nathaniel Tsai, the 18-year-old challenger to Holden, finished with 41% of the vote.

2020 California State Assembly

Legislation 
In his first term, Holden introduced legislation to require California schools to teach about the significance of the Barack Obama presidency.  He  introduced legislation to tackle the problem of grease thievery at restaurants.  He also introduced legislation to study and foster economic development and job creation.

Holden also has been a leader in the legislation to address California's wildfire crisis.  He passed into law successful legislation on the topic, and was a lead negotiator during the process. </ref>

References

External links
 —41st State Assembly district
 Campaign website
 Join California - Chris Holden

1960 births
African-American state legislators in California
California city council members
Living people
Mayors of Pasadena, California
Democratic Party members of the California State Assembly
San Diego State University alumni
21st-century American politicians
Pasadena High School (California) alumni
21st-century African-American politicians
20th-century African-American people
African-American mayors in California